Suzanne Farrington (née Holman; 12 October 1933 – 1 March 2015) was the only child of British actress Vivien Leigh and her first husband, Herbert Leigh Holman. Upon her mother's death, Farrington was bequeathed her mother's papers, including her letters, photographs, contracts and diaries.

Early years
On 12 October 1933, Suzanne Holman was born at a nursing home at 8 Bulstrode Street, London. Her mother was 19 years old, and had been married to the barrister Herbert Leigh Holman for less than a year. Her diary entry on this day simply read: "Had a baby – a girl." The birth was difficult: Suzanne was born a month prematurely and the delivery was not an easy one. It was several weeks before mother and daughter came home, but once there it did not take Vivien long to become bored, as the household was being run quite adequately by the staff, and the baby was well tended by the nurse nanny. The Holman household consisted of a maid, cook and Nanny Oake who had been hired to care for the baby.

Although Vivien concentrated on her acting career, soon receiving good notices in the play, The Mask of Virtue, she did occasionally appear in the role of the new mother, being photographed holding her baby. Under her professional name of Vivien Leigh, her mother became more involved in and more successful with her acting career, while her husband and raising her daughter became less important.

Although Leigh initially had great concern for her daughter's well-being, her career was paramount and Suzanne's care became the responsibility of her father and maternal grandmother, Gertrude Hartley. During the Second World War, Suzanne travelled to Canada with her grandmother, to stay with her aunt, Florence Thompson. She continued her education during the war years, first at a convent school in Vancouver.

Only once, in November 1940, did Leigh visit her daughter in Canada. The visit turned out to be traumatic for all involved as the media soon discovered that "Scarlett" was in Vancouver, and that her daughter was enrolled in a convent school, spurring not only unwanted publicity for Suzanne but spurious claims that she would be the subject of a kidnapping. The Reverend Mother also feared for the safety of other children in her care, resulting in Suzanne being transferred by her grandmother to a day school. Gertrude Hartley altered her plans and remained with her granddaughter throughout the war years.

In 1940 Leigh and Holman divorced. Her father gained custody over Suzanne, and bought Manor Farm House at Zeals, Wiltshire, for them both to live in.

After her marriage to Laurence Olivier, Leigh had little contact with her daughter until 1950, although Suzanne became close with Simon Tarquin Olivier, her stepfather's son from his marriage to Jill Esmond. Her "coming out" party was held at the Oliviers' flat in Lowndes Square, London.

Later years
After completing her education at Sherborne School for Girls (in Dorset) and a Swiss finishing school, beginning in 1951, Suzanne studied for two years at the Royal Academy of Dramatic Art. Although hoping to become an actress, after her appearance at the faculty's annual performance in March 1953, she did not continue in that career.

Film historian Kendra Bean described Suzanne's formative and later life, during which her grandmother continued to act as a "surrogate mother." During the late 1950s, she instructed at her grandmother's Academy of Beauty Culture in Knightsbridge. Suzanne continued her close friendship with Tarquin.

By the late 1950s, Suzanne and her mother began a more intimate mother-daughter relationship, with Vivien visiting the Zeals house and Suzanne often travelling and holidaying with both her biological parents. After returning from a holiday in Italy with her parents, on 6 December 1957, she married the insurance broker and executive Robin Neville Farrington, five years her senior. The reception was held at the Hyde Park Hotel, London. Leigh Holman, Vivien Leigh and Laurence Olivier were all in attendance. On 5 December 1958, Suzanne gave birth to the first of three sons, Neville Leigh Farrington. Rupert and Jonathan Farrington were the other siblings.

After the death of her mother on 8 July 1967, Suzanne received the bulk of the estate. With the full support of her mother's long-time caretaker and partner Jack Merivale, she received the private papers of Vivien Leigh, which included letters, photographs, contracts and diaries from 1932 onwards.

When her father died on 8 February 1982, Suzanne inherited the Zeals house. In the late 1980s, author Hugo Vickers contacted her to access Leigh's papers to write Vivien Leigh: A Biography (1988). In 2005, biographer Terry Coleman was able to access Leigh's papers when he wrote Olivier, The Authorised Biography, and he thanked Farrington in the foreword.

In one of her rare public appearances, Suzanne Farrington was present in 2003 at the opening of the Farrington Music School at the Port Regis School, Dorset, named after her late husband, the former Chairman of the school.

Death
Suzanne Farrington died in Lower Zeals, Wiltshire, on 1 March 2015, aged 81, from undisclosed causes. Her husband, Robin Farrington, died on 13 June 2002.

References

Citations

Bibliography

 Bean, Kendra. Vivien Leigh: An Intimate Portrait. Philadelphia, Pennsylvania: Running Press, 2013; .
 Capus, Michelangelo. Vivien Leigh: A Biography. Jefferson, North Carolina: McFarland & Company, 2003; .
 Coleman, Terry. Olivier: The Authorised Biography. London: Bloomsbury Publishing, 2005; .
 Dent, Alan. Vivian Leigh: a Bouquet. London: Hamilton, 1969; 
 Edwards, Anne. Vivien Leigh, A Biography. London: Coronet Books, 1978 edition; 
 Spoto, Donald. Laurence Olivier: A Biography. London: Cooper Square Press, 2001; 
 Taylor, John Russell. Vivien Leigh. London: Elm Tree Books, 1984; 
 Vickers, Hugo. Vivien Leigh: A Biography. London: Little, Brown and Company, 1988 edition; 
 Walker, Alexander. Vivien: The Life of Vivien Leigh. New York: Grove Press, 1987; 
 Madrid, José Vivien Leigh. The Scarlett O'Hara tragedy Madrid, Spain: T&B Editores, 2013;

External links
 The Vintage Bride: Suzanne Holman Farrington
 

1933 births
2015 deaths
Alumni of RADA
Place of death missing
People from Marylebone